It's Russian is a 2004 Russian comedy film directed by Aleksandr Veledinsky.

Plot 
In 1959 Kharkiv, young poet Eduard "Ed" Savenko is trying to get attention from the girl he fell in love with, Svetka, who tells him that he's "too poor for her". He attempts to find some money to take her to a restaurant, unsuccessfully asking his mother for it, trying to sell a trophy razor from the Nazi Germany, and eventually he ends up robbing a store; yet, in the end, Svetka goes out with a local thief.

In despair, Ed gets drunk and gives Svetka a visit, reading her a poem he wrote, while holding a knife behind his back; however, he doesn't harm her and instead cuts his wrist, what puts him in the Saburova Dacha psychiatric hospital, colloquially known as "Saburka". Due to the children's ward being full, he gets put in a ward with adult patients, which include Uncle Sasha, who pretends he participated in the October Revolution; "Magellan", a diagnosed psychopath; Mikhaylov, who is an expert in literature and often chips off tiles in the bathrooms; and Avaz, who is addicted to masturbation.

Ed and "Magellan" escape not long before the New Year, with Ed having sex with Svetka. Ed visits a church, begging God to make his life interesting, and they are caught by police the next day, thanks to a clue from his mother. She is later told by Ed to tell the local hooligans that he is getting "killed" in the hospital, and they end up rioting in front of the hospital.

Professor Arkhipov from Moscow arrives soon though, and he discharges Ed, since he recognizes his "suicide attempt" as simply an action to get attention from the world.

Cast 
 Andrey Chadov as Ed
 Olga Arntgolts as Svetka
 Evdokiya Germanova as Mother
 Mikhail Efremov as Father
 Vladimir Steklov as Zilberman
 Aleksey Gorbunov as Gorkun
 Dmitry Dyuzhev as Slavka
 Anatoliy Zalyubovsky as Kadik
 Oleg Lopukhov as Sanya
 Viktor Rakov as Mikhaylov

References

External links 
 

2004 films
2000s Russian-language films
Russian comedy films
Eduard Limonov